Unonopsis magnifolia is a species of plant in the Annonaceae family. It is endemic to Ecuador.  Its natural habitat is subtropical or tropical moist lowland forests. It is threatened by habitat loss.

References

Annonaceae
Endemic flora of Ecuador
Vulnerable plants
Taxonomy articles created by Polbot